Kariz-e Bala (also Romanized as Kārīz-e Bālā) is a village in Zaveh Rural District, in the Central District of Zaveh County, Razavi Khorasan Province, Iran. At the 2006 census, its population was 537, in 159 families.

References 

Populated places in Zaveh County